Uptown is a 1987 Spanish comedy-drama film by Jose Luis Garcia Berlanga.  The film stars Victoria Abril as a Barcelonian divorcee caught up in a mystery regarding the disappearance and possible murder of one her closet friends.

Plot
Verónica, is recently divorced and begins to reorganize her life and adapt herself to life as a single woman. Her problems are relegated to the background when she believes Carlos, her masseur, is killed. Knowing himself in danger, Carlos left Verónica with a message on the answering machine stating that she had to pick up a package hidden in the sinks of a railway station. Veronica's predicament is further complicated by her ex-husband, Edmundo and her boyfriend, Luis, who are business partners.

Cast
 Victoria Abril as Veronica
  Juanjo Puigcorbé  as Luis
  Pepe Rubianes as Edmundo
  Abel Folk as Carlos
  Carmen Conesa as Ana
  Llorenç Santamaria as Hungaro
  Albert Vidal as Kramer

References

1987 films
1980s Spanish-language films
Barcelona in fiction